The Storm is the tenth studio album by American country music artist Travis Tritt. It was also his only album for the Category 5 Records label. In 2013, Travis Tritt re-released the album under the new title "The Calm After" via his own Post Oak Records label. The re-release features two new songs consisting of classic covers.

History
Five of this album's tracks are covers: "Should've Listened" was originally recorded by Canadian rock band Nickelback on their The Long Road album, "I Don't Know How I Got By" was originally recorded by Edwin McCain for the soundtrack of the film The Family Man, "You Never Take Me Dancing" was previously recorded by Richard Marx on his album Flesh and Bone, "Somehow, Somewhere, Someway" was written/recorded by Kenny Wayne Shepherd from his 1997 album, Trouble Is..., and "The Pressure Is On" is the title cut of a 1981 album release by Hank Williams, Jr. "You Never Take Me Dancing" was released as a single from this album, reaching number 27 on the Hot Country Songs charts in 2007. It was followed by "Something Stronger Than Me", which failed to chart. Category 5 closed soon afterward.

In 2013, Tritt acquired the rights to the album in order to re-release it via his own Post Oak Records under the title The Calm After... The re-release includes a cover of the Patty Smyth and Don Henley duet "Sometimes Love Just Ain't Enough" with his daughter, Tyler Reese, and a cover of Faces' "Stay with Me". The Calm After... sold more than 2.000 copies in its opening week and entered the Country Albums chart at number 31.

Track listing

Personnel ("The Storm")
Kenny Aronoff - drums
Michael Atwood - cello
Sherree Ford Brown - background vocals
Paul Bushnell - bass guitar
Caroline Campbell - violin
Vinnie Colaiuta - drums
Luis Conte - percussion
Charlie Daniels - fiddle
Tabitha Fair - background vocals
Storm L. Gardner - background vocals
Siedah Garrett - background vocals
Sharlotte Gibson - background vocals
James Harrah - acoustic guitar, electric guitar
Joel Pargman - viola
Matt Rollings - piano, Wurlitzer
Kenny Wayne Shepherd - electric guitar
Cameron Stone - violin
Travis Tritt - acoustic guitar, gut string guitar, lead vocals, background vocals
Patrick Warren - string arrangements
Gabe Witcher - fiddle
Jimmie Wood - harmonica

Track listing (The Calm After)
"Mudcat Moan (Prelude)"/"You Never Take Me Dancing" - 5:29
"(I Wanna) Feel Too Much" - 4:03
"Doesn't the Good Outweigh the Bad" - 4:23
"Sometimes Love Just Ain't Enough" (Patty Smyth, Glen Burtnik) — 4:50
"What If Love Hangs On" - 4:02
"Rub Off on Me" - 4:40
"Stay with Me" (Rod Stewart, Ronnie Wood) — 4:41
"Something Stronger Than Me" - 3:39
"The Storm" - 4:42
"I Don't Know How I Got By" - 3:45
"The Pressure Is On" - 3:54
"Should've Listened" - 3:30
"High Time for Gettin' Down" - 2:43
"Somehow, Somewhere, Someday" - 5:42

Personnel ("The Calm After")
Rusty Anderson - electric guitar
Kenny Aronoff - drums
Michael Atwood - cello
Sherree Ford Brown - background vocals
Paul Bushnell - bass guitar
Caroline Campbell - violin
Vinnie Colaiuta - drums
Luis Conte - percussion
Jim Cox - Hammond B-3 organ
Charlie Daniels - fiddle
Tabitha Fair - background vocals
Mike Finnigan - Hammond B-3 organ, piano
Storm L. Gardner - background vocals
Siedah Garrett - background vocals
Sharlotte Gibson - background vocals
James Harrah - acoustic guitar, electric guitar
Greg Leisz - pedal steel guitar
Joel Pargman - viola
Matt Rollings - piano, Wurlitzer
Kenny Wayne Shepherd - electric guitar
Cameron Stone - violin
Michael Thompson - acoustic guitar, electric guitar
Travis Tritt - acoustic guitar, gut string guitar, lead vocals, background vocals
Tyler Reese Tritt - vocals on "Sometimes Love Just Ain't Enough"
Patrick Warren - string arrangements
Gabe Witcher - fiddle
Jimmie Wood - harmonica

Chart performance

The Storm

The Calm After...

References

2007 albums
Travis Tritt albums
Category 5 Records albums
Albums produced by Randy Jackson